Two species of lizard are named  Stolzmann's lizard:

Liolaemus reichei
Liolaemus stolzmanni